The 1940 Pittsburgh Pirates season was the 59th season of the Pittsburgh Pirates franchise; the 54th in the National League. The Pirates finished fourth in the league standings with a record of 78–76.

Offseason 
 Prior to 1940 season: Billy Cox was signed as an amateur free agent by the Pirates.

Regular season

Season standings

Record vs. opponents

Game log

|- bgcolor="ccffcc"
| 1 || April 16 || @ Cardinals || 6–4 || Klinger (1–0) || Davis || Lanahan (1) || 16,600 || 1–0
|- bgcolor="ccffcc"
| 2 || April 22 || Cubs || 9–5 || Bowman (1–0) || Passeau || Butcher (1) || 10,461 || 2–0
|- bgcolor="ccffcc"
| 3 || April 23 || Cubs || 3–2 || Brown (1–0) || French || — || 4,138 || 3–0
|- bgcolor="ffbbbb"
| 4 || April 24 || Cubs || 4–9 || Lee || Butcher (0–1) || — || 3,809 || 3–1
|- bgcolor="ffbbbb"
| 5 || April 25 || Cardinals || 9–10 || Shoun || Klinger (1–1) || Russell || 3,394 || 3–2
|- bgcolor="ccffcc"
| 6 || April 26 || Cardinals || 10–4 || Brown (2–0) || Bowman || — || 3,912 || 4–2
|- bgcolor="ffbbbb"
| 7 || April 27 || @ Reds || 0–3 || Walters || Bowman (1–1) || — || 5,950 || 4–3
|- bgcolor="ffbbbb"
| 8 || April 28 || @ Reds || 2–8 || Thompson || MacFayden (0–1) || — || 19,337 || 4–4
|- bgcolor="ffbbbb"
| 9 || April 29 || @ Reds || 2–3 || Derringer || Butcher (0–2) || — || 1,549 || 4–5
|- bgcolor="ffbbbb"
| 10 || April 30 || Phillies || 2–6 || Mulcahy || Klinger (1–2) || — || 2,015 || 4–6
|-

|- bgcolor="ffbbbb"
| 11 || May 5 || Bees || 1–5 || Strincevich || Brown (2–1) || Coffman || 10,992 || 4–7
|- bgcolor="ffbbbb"
| 12 || May 6 || Bees || 7–10 (12) || Swift || Swigart (0–1) || Sullivan || 2,142 || 4–8
|- bgcolor="ffbbbb"
| 13 || May 7 || Bees || 9–11 || Earley || Lanning (0–1) || Swift || 2,098 || 4–9
|- bgcolor="ffbbbb"
| 14 || May 8 || Giants || 6–10 || Melton || Klinger (1–3) || Schumacher || 3,564 || 4–10
|- bgcolor="ffbbbb"
| 15 || May 9 || Giants || 6–17 || Hubbell || Butcher (0–3) || — || 3,492 || 4–11
|- bgcolor="ccffcc"
| 16 || May 10 || @ Cubs || 8–3 || Brown (3–1) || Lee || — || 3,448 || 5–11
|- bgcolor="ffbbbb"
| 17 || May 11 || @ Cubs || 5–7 || Page || Bowman (1–2) || — || 7,211 || 5–12
|- bgcolor="ffbbbb"
| 18 || May 12 || @ Cubs || 5–7 || Olsen || Lanahan (0–1) || Passeau || 17,955 || 5–13
|- bgcolor="ccffcc"
| 19 || May 14 || @ Giants || 7–2 || Klinger (2–3) || Melton || — || 4,373 || 6–13
|- bgcolor="ffbbbb"
| 20 || May 15 || @ Giants || 2–5 || Hubbell || Brown (3–2) || — || 4,324 || 6–14
|- bgcolor="ffbbbb"
| 21 || May 18 || @ Bees || 5–15 || Piechota || Butcher (0–4) || — || 4,264 || 6–15
|- bgcolor="ffbbbb"
| 22 || May 19 || @ Phillies || 5–6 || Johnson || Sewell (0–1) || — || 8,981 || 6–16
|- bgcolor="ffbbbb"
| 23 || May 20 || @ Phillies || 7–8 || Hoerst || Lanahan (0–2) || — || 1,000 || 6–17
|- bgcolor="ffbbbb"
| 24 || May 22 || @ Dodgers || 1–3 || Fitzsimmons || Klinger (2–4) || — || 3,149 || 6–18
|- bgcolor="ccffcc"
| 25 || May 25 || Cubs || 12–7 || Bowman (2–2) || French || — || 2,806 || 7–18
|- bgcolor="ccffcc"
| 26 || May 26 || Cubs || 3–2 || Klinger (3–4) || Lee || — || 8,771 || 8–18
|- bgcolor="ffbbbb"
| 27 || May 27 || Reds || 1–2 || Beggs || Brown (3–3) || — || — || 8–19
|- bgcolor="ffbbbb"
| 28 || May 27 || Reds || 3–7 || Turner || Bauers (0–1) || — || 6,258 || 8–20
|- bgcolor="ccffcc"
| 29 || May 28 || Reds || 5–2 || Butcher (1–4) || Thompson || — || 1,359 || 9–20
|- bgcolor="ffbbbb"
| 30 || May 29 || Reds || 0–4 || Walters || Bowman (2–3) || — || 2,259 || 9–21
|-

|- bgcolor="ccffcc"
| 31 || June 2 || Giants || 2–1 || Klinger (4–4) || Schumacher || MacFayden (1) || — || 10–21
|- bgcolor="ffbbbb"
| 32 || June 2 || Giants || 3–7 (8) || Melton || Brown (3–4) || Gumbert || 18,634 || 10–22
|- bgcolor="ffbbbb"
| 33 || June 3 || Giants || 3–4 || Lohrman || Butcher (1–5) || — || 1,987 || 10–23
|- bgcolor="ccffcc"
| 34 || June 4 || Bees || 14–2 || Bowman (3–3) || Callahan || — || 20,310 || 11–23
|- bgcolor="ccffcc"
| 35 || June 6 || Bees || 7–6 || Sewell (1–1) || Sullivan || — || 1,165 || 12–23
|- bgcolor="ccffcc"
| 36 || June 7 || Phillies || 10–4 || Lanning (1–1) || Johnson || — || 1,174 || 13–23
|- bgcolor="ccffcc"
| 37 || June 8 || Phillies || 6–5 || Heintzelman (1–0) || Johnson || Brown (1) || 3,055 || 14–23
|- bgcolor="ffbbbb"
| 38 || June 9 || Phillies || 1–6 || Mulcahy || Klinger (4–5) || — || 14,450 || 14–24
|- bgcolor="ccffcc"
| 39 || June 9 || Phillies || 11–5 (8) || Brown (4–4) || Pearson || — || 14,450 || 15–24
|- bgcolor="ffbbbb"
| 40 || June 10 || Dodgers || 7–8 || Fitzsimmons || Lanahan (0–3) || — || 2,659 || 15–25
|- bgcolor="ffbbbb"
| 41 || June 12 || Dodgers || 4–5 || Wyatt || Brown (4–5) || — || 20,179 || 15–26
|- bgcolor="ffbbbb"
| 42 || June 14 || @ Giants || 6–8 || Lohrman || Klinger (4–6) || Brown || 5,955 || 15–27
|- bgcolor="ffbbbb"
| 43 || June 15 || @ Giants || 1–12 || Schumacher || Bowman (3–4) || — || 5,941 || 15–28
|- bgcolor="ccffcc"
| 44 || June 16 || @ Giants || 5–0 || Butcher (2–5) || Hubbell || — || 34,282 || 16–28
|- bgcolor="ccffcc"
| 45 || June 16 || @ Giants || 5–3 || Sewell (2–1) || Gumbert || Heintzelman (1) || 34,282 || 17–28
|- bgcolor="ffbbbb"
| 46 || June 17 || @ Bees || 3–5 || Posedel || Lanning (1–2) || — || — || 17–29
|- bgcolor="ffbbbb"
| 47 || June 17 || @ Bees || 1–5 || Piechota || Brown (4–6) || — || 5,224 || 17–30
|- bgcolor="ccffcc"
| 48 || June 19 || @ Bees || 5–1 || Bowman (4–4) || Errickson || — || 1,771 || 18–30
|- bgcolor="ccffcc"
| 49 || June 20 || @ Bees || 8–7 || Butcher (3–5) || Fette || Brown (2) || 1,445 || 19–30
|- bgcolor="ffbbbb"
| 50 || June 21 || @ Dodgers || 8–10 || Fitzsimmons || Klinger (4–7) || Tamulis || 6,106 || 19–31
|- bgcolor="ccffcc"
| 51 || June 22 || @ Dodgers || 7–2 || Sewell (3–1) || Carleton || — || 10,850 || 20–31
|- bgcolor="ccffcc"
| 52 || June 23 || @ Dodgers || 8–5 || MacFayden (1–1) || Wyatt || Brown (3) || — || 21–31
|- bgcolor="ffffff"
| 53 || June 23 || @ Dodgers || 4–4 (13) ||  ||  || — || 24,239 || 21–31
|- bgcolor="ccffcc"
| 54 || June 25 || @ Phillies || 9–7 || Lanning (2–2) || Higbe || Klinger (1) || 1,000 || 22–31
|- bgcolor="ffbbbb"
| 55 || June 26 || @ Phillies || 2–4 || Blanton || Bowman (4–5) || — || 12,565 || 22–32
|- bgcolor="ccffcc"
| 56 || June 26 || @ Phillies || 11–6 || Sewell (4–1) || Beck || Brown (4) || 12,565 || 23–32
|- bgcolor="ffbbbb"
| 57 || June 28 || Cardinals || 2–8 || McGee || Heintzelman (1–1) || — || 20,490 || 23–33
|- bgcolor="ffbbbb"
| 58 || June 30 || Cardinals || 0–1 || Cooper || Klinger (4–8) || — || — || 23–34
|- bgcolor="ccffcc"
| 59 || June 30 || Cardinals || 2–0 || Butcher (4–5) || Shoun || — || 25,096 || 24–34
|-

|- bgcolor="ccffcc"
| 60 || July 1 || @ Cubs || 4–3 (10) || Brown (5–6) || Olsen || — || 4,335 || 25–34
|- bgcolor="ffbbbb"
| 61 || July 2 || @ Cubs || 0–10 || Lee || Bowman (4–6) || — || 5,120 || 25–35
|- bgcolor="ffbbbb"
| 62 || July 3 || @ Cubs || 5–7 || Passeau || Bauers (0–2) || — || 5,678 || 25–36
|- bgcolor="ffbbbb"
| 63 || July 4 || @ Reds || 1–9 || Walters || Klinger (4–9) || — || — || 25–37
|- bgcolor="ffbbbb"
| 64 || July 4 || @ Reds || 1–3 || Thompson || Butcher (4–6) || — || 19,399 || 25–38
|- bgcolor="ffbbbb"
| 65 || July 5 || @ Reds || 4–5 || Beggs || MacFayden (1–2) || — || 5,682 || 25–39
|- bgcolor="ccffcc"
| 66 || July 6 || @ Cardinals || 15–8 || Klinger (5–9) || Russell || Lanning (1) || — || 26–39
|- bgcolor="ccffcc"
| 67 || July 6 || @ Cardinals || 4–3 (10) || Brown (6–6) || Warneke || — || 3,537 || 27–39
|- bgcolor="ccffcc"
| 68 || July 7 || @ Cardinals || 7–6 || Sewell (5–1) || Shoun || Lanahan (2) || — || 28–39
|- bgcolor="ccffcc"
| 69 || July 7 || @ Cardinals || 4–1 || Heintzelman (2–1) || Cooper || — || 7,303 || 29–39
|- bgcolor="ffbbbb"
| 70 || July 12 || Phillies || 3–6 || Mulcahy || Bowman (4–7) || — || 9,042 || 29–40
|- bgcolor="ccffcc"
| 71 || July 13 || Phillies || 9–8 || MacFayden (2–2) || Johnson || Bowman (1) || 2,375 || 30–40
|- bgcolor="ccffcc"
| 72 || July 14 || Dodgers || 6–2 || Sewell (6–1) || Hamlin || — || 33,336 || 31–40
|- bgcolor="ffbbbb"
| 73 || July 14 || Dodgers || 0–2 || Fitzsimmons || Heintzelman (2–2) || — || 33,336 || 31–41
|- bgcolor="ffbbbb"
| 74 || July 15 || Dodgers || 1–10 || Wyatt || Butcher (4–7) || — || — || 31–42
|- bgcolor="ccffcc"
| 75 || July 15 || Dodgers || 4–3 || Klinger (6–9) || Pressnell || — || 12,215 || 32–42
|- bgcolor="ccffcc"
| 76 || July 16 || Dodgers || 5–3 || Lanning (3–2) || Pressnell || — || 2,271 || 33–42
|- bgcolor="ffbbbb"
| 77 || July 18 || Giants || 1–6 || Hubbell || Heintzelman (2–3) || — || 25,188 || 33–43
|- bgcolor="ffbbbb"
| 78 || July 19 || Giants || 2–5 || Schumacher || Sewell (6–2) || Gumbert || 2,481 || 33–44
|- bgcolor="ccffcc"
| 79 || July 20 || Bees || 17–6 || Brown (7–6) || Errickson || — || 2,661 || 34–44
|- bgcolor="ccffcc"
| 80 || July 21 || Bees || 5–3 || Lanahan (1–3) || Salvo || Brown (5) || — || 35–44
|- bgcolor="ccffcc"
| 81 || July 21 || Bees || 16–2 (8) || Bowman (5–7) || Posedel || — || 11,071 || 36–44
|- bgcolor="ffbbbb"
| 82 || July 23 || @ Giants || 1–9 || Hubbell || Klinger (6–10) || — || 12,428 || 36–45
|- bgcolor="ccffcc"
| 83 || July 25 || @ Giants || 2–1 || Sewell (7–2) || Schumacher || — || 3,265 || 37–45
|- bgcolor="ccffcc"
| 84 || July 26 || @ Bees || 9–0 || Heintzelman (3–3) || Posedel || — || 1,093 || 38–45
|- bgcolor="ccffcc"
| 85 || July 27 || @ Bees || 10–4 || MacFayden (3–2) || Sullivan || — || 1,509 || 39–45
|- bgcolor="ccffcc"
| 86 || July 28 || @ Bees || 5–2 || Lanahan (2–3) || Errickson || — || — || 40–45
|- bgcolor="ccffcc"
| 87 || July 28 || @ Bees || 7–3 || Butcher (5–7) || Javery || — || 5,471 || 41–45
|- bgcolor="ffbbbb"
| 88 || July 29 || @ Dodgers || 6–7 || Pressnell || Brown (7–7) || — || 3,537 || 41–46
|- bgcolor="ccffcc"
| 89 || July 30 || @ Dodgers || 8–2 || Sewell (8–2) || Head || — || 19,910 || 42–46
|-

|- bgcolor="ffbbbb"
| 90 || August 1 || @ Dodgers || 3–8 || Wyatt || Heintzelman (3–4) || — || — || 42–47
|- bgcolor="ffbbbb"
| 91 || August 1 || @ Dodgers || 7–8 || Casey || Lanahan (2–4) || — || 19,393 || 42–48
|- bgcolor="ccffcc"
| 92 || August 2 || @ Phillies || 5–2 (10) || Bowman (6–7) || Johnson || Klinger (2) || 7,521 || 43–48
|- bgcolor="ccffcc"
| 93 || August 3 || @ Phillies || 8–0 || Brown (8–7) || Higbe || — || 1,000 || 44–48
|- bgcolor="ccffcc"
| 94 || August 4 || @ Phillies || 6–1 || Sewell (9–2) || Mulcahy || — || — || 45–48
|- bgcolor="ccffcc"
| 95 || August 4 || @ Phillies || 6–4 || Lanning (4–2) || Frye || Heintzelman (2) || 7,182 || 46–48
|- bgcolor="ccffcc"
| 96 || August 6 || Cardinals || 3–1 || Heintzelman (4–4) || Cooper || — || 8,582 || 47–48
|- bgcolor="ccffcc"
| 97 || August 7 || Cardinals || 10–9 || Klinger (7–10) || Shoun || Lanning (2) || 5,640 || 48–48
|- bgcolor="ccffcc"
| 98 || August 7 || Cardinals || 12–6 || Butcher (6–7) || Lanier || Bowman (2) || 5,640 || 49–48
|- bgcolor="ccffcc"
| 99 || August 9 || Cubs || 6–2 || Sewell (10–2) || Raffensberger || — || 29,978 || 50–48
|- bgcolor="ffbbbb"
| 100 || August 10 || Cubs || 0–1 || Olsen || Klinger (7–11) || — || 4,474 || 50–49
|- bgcolor="ccffcc"
| 101 || August 11 || Cubs || 7–3 || Lanning (5–2) || Raffensberger || — || — || 51–49
|- bgcolor="ccffcc"
| 102 || August 11 || Cubs || 5–1 || Lanahan (3–4) || Passeau || — || 28,968 || 52–49
|- bgcolor="ccffcc"
| 103 || August 12 || Reds || 4–2 || Butcher (7–7) || Walters || — || 42,254 || 53–49
|- bgcolor="ffbbbb"
| 104 || August 13 || Reds || 3–4 (10) || Beggs || Heintzelman (4–5) || — || 6,810 || 53–50
|- bgcolor="ffbbbb"
| 105 || August 14 || @ Cardinals || 6–7 (11) || Shoun || Brown (8–8) || — || 11,077 || 53–51
|- bgcolor="ccffcc"
| 106 || August 16 || @ Cardinals || 6–5 || Lanning (6–2) || McGee || — || 4,218 || 54–51
|- bgcolor="ffbbbb"
| 107 || August 16 || @ Cardinals || 5–9 || Warneke || Butcher (7–8) || — || 4,218 || 54–52
|- bgcolor="ffbbbb"
| 108 || August 17 || @ Cubs || 5–6 (13) || Passeau || MacFayden (3–3) || — || 6,003 || 54–53
|- bgcolor="ffbbbb"
| 109 || August 18 || @ Cubs || 1–9 || French || Sewell (10–3) || — || 7,597 || 54–54
|- bgcolor="ffbbbb"
| 110 || August 19 || Bees || 0–3 || Errickson || Bowman (6–8) || — || 1,803 || 54–55
|- bgcolor="ccffcc"
| 111 || August 20 || Bees || 6–3 || Lanahan (4–4) || Salvo || — || 1,050 || 55–55
|- bgcolor="ccffcc"
| 112 || August 21 || Bees || 3–2 || Heintzelman (5–5) || Coffman || — || 2,281 || 56–55
|- bgcolor="ffbbbb"
| 113 || August 22 || Giants || 4–5 (12) || Dean || MacFayden (3–4) || — || — || 56–56
|- bgcolor="ccffcc"
| 114 || August 22 || Giants || 4–0 || Sewell (11–3) || Melton || — || 12,523 || 57–56
|- bgcolor="ccffcc"
| 115 || August 23 || Giants || 13–10 || Heintzelman (6–5) || Hubbell || — || 2,562 || 58–56
|- bgcolor="ffbbbb"
| 116 || August 24 || Giants || 6–7 || Hubbell || Heintzelman (6–6) || — || 7,630 || 58–57
|- bgcolor="ccffcc"
| 117 || August 25 || Dodgers || 4–3 || Lanahan (5–4) || Wyatt || — || 22,257 || 59–57
|- bgcolor="ffbbbb"
| 118 || August 25 || Dodgers || 1–8 || Fitzsimmons || Klinger (7–12) || — || 22,257 || 59–58
|- bgcolor="ccffcc"
| 119 || August 28 || Phillies || 5–0 || Sewell (12–3) || Mulcahy || — || 4,100 || 60–58
|- bgcolor="ccffcc"
| 120 || August 28 || Phillies || 5–2 || Bowman (7–8) || Higbe || — || 4,100 || 61–58
|- bgcolor="ccffcc"
| 121 || August 29 || Phillies || 4–0 || Brown (9–8) || Pearson || MacFayden (2) || 2,239 || 62–58
|-

|- bgcolor="ccffcc"
| 122 || September 1 || Cardinals || 10–0 || Heintzelman (7–6) || Shoun || — || — || 63–58
|- bgcolor="ffffff"
| 123 || September 1 || Cardinals || 5–5 (11) ||  ||  || — || 20,945 || 63–58
|- bgcolor="ccffcc"
| 124 || September 2 || Cubs || 5–2 || Sewell (13–3) || Root || — || — || 64–58
|- bgcolor="ffbbbb"
| 125 || September 2 || Cubs || 1–7 || Olsen || Bowman (7–9) || — || 26,120 || 64–59
|- bgcolor="ffbbbb"
| 126 || September 4 || @ Reds || 2–3 (12) || Beggs || Lanahan (5–5) || — || 30,543 || 64–60
|- bgcolor="ffbbbb"
| 127 || September 5 || @ Reds || 3–6 || Vander Meer || Lanning (6–3) || — || 7,661 || 64–61
|- bgcolor="ccffcc"
| 128 || September 7 || @ Cardinals || 14–9 || MacFayden (4–4) || Doyle || Brown (6) || 2,065 || 65–61
|- bgcolor="ccffcc"
| 129 || September 8 || @ Cardinals || 16–14 || Lanahan (6–5) || McGee || Heintzelman (3) || — || 66–61
|- bgcolor="ccffcc"
| 130 || September 8 || @ Cardinals || 5–4 (5) || Klinger (8–12) || Warneke || Butcher (2) || 10,718 || 67–61
|- bgcolor="ccffcc"
| 131 || September 10 || @ Phillies || 11–3 || Bowman (8–9) || Mulcahy || — || — || 68–61
|- bgcolor="ccffcc"
| 132 || September 10 || @ Phillies || 11–1 || Sewell (14–3) || Frye || — || 1,000 || 69–61
|- bgcolor="ccffcc"
| 133 || September 11 || @ Phillies || 9–3 || Brown (10–8) || Pearson || — || 2,500 || 70–61
|- bgcolor="ffbbbb"
| 134 || September 12 || @ Dodgers || 0–7 || Casey || Heintzelman (7–7) || — || — || 70–62
|- bgcolor="ffbbbb"
| 135 || September 12 || @ Dodgers || 4–7 || Casey || Lanahan (6–6) || — || 10,570 || 70–63
|- bgcolor="ffbbbb"
| 136 || September 13 || @ Dodgers || 2–8 || Head || Klinger (8–13) || — || 2,769 || 70–64
|- bgcolor="ffbbbb"
| 137 || September 14 || @ Dodgers || 0–5 || Fitzsimmons || Lanahan (6–7) || — || — || 70–65
|- bgcolor="ffbbbb"
| 138 || September 14 || @ Dodgers || 2–4 || Carleton || Lanning (6–4) || — || 16,278 || 70–66
|- bgcolor="ccffcc"
| 139 || September 15 || @ Giants || 10–3 || Sewell (15–3) || Melton || — || — || 71–66
|- bgcolor="ccffcc"
| 140 || September 15 || @ Giants || 4–3 || Bowman (9–9) || Gumbert || — || 9,240 || 72–66
|- bgcolor="ccffcc"
| 141 || September 16 || @ Giants || 7–6 || Butcher (8–8) || Lohrman || Klinger (3) || 1,262 || 73–66
|- bgcolor="ffbbbb"
| 142 || September 17 || @ Bees || 5–10 || Errickson || Lanahan (6–8) || Strincevich || 1,077 || 73–67
|- bgcolor="ffbbbb"
| 143 || September 18 || @ Bees || 1–4 || Tobin || Bowman (9–10) || — || 2,013 || 73–68
|- bgcolor="ffbbbb"
| 144 || September 19 || Cardinals || 1–2 || McGee || Sewell (15–4) || — || — || 73–69
|- bgcolor="ffbbbb"
| 145 || September 19 || Cardinals || 2–8 || Hutchinson || Heintzelman (7–8) || — || 5,048 || 73–70
|- bgcolor="ffbbbb"
| 146 || September 21 || Reds || 1–8 || Walters || Butcher (8–9) || — || — || 73–71
|- bgcolor="ccffcc"
| 147 || September 21 || Reds || 8–7 (10) || MacFayden (5–4) || Riddle || — || 6,395 || 74–71
|- bgcolor="ffbbbb"
| 148 || September 22 || Reds || 1–2 || Turner || Swigart (0–2) || — || — || 74–72
|- bgcolor="ccffcc"
| 149 || September 22 || Reds || 8–1 || Lanning (7–4) || Vander Meer || — || 14,865 || 75–72
|- bgcolor="ccffcc"
| 150 || September 23 || Reds || 12–9 || Heintzelman (8–8) || Beggs || Brown (7) || 2,098 || 76–72
|- bgcolor="ffbbbb"
| 151 || September 25 || @ Cubs || 1–2 (11) || Lee || Sewell (15–5) || — || — || 76–73
|- bgcolor="ffbbbb"
| 152 || September 25 || @ Cubs || 4–6 || Olsen || Brown (10–9) || Raffensberger || 7,828 || 76–74
|- bgcolor="ccffcc"
| 153 || September 26 || @ Cubs || 7–6 || Lanning (8–4) || Bryant || Sewell (1) || 1,789 || 77–74
|- bgcolor="ccffcc"
| 154 || September 27 || @ Reds || 4–3 (10) || Sewell (16–5) || Moore || — || 3,173 || 78–74
|- bgcolor="ffbbbb"
| 155 || September 28 || @ Reds || 5–6 || Turner || Dietz (0–1) || Moore || 6,603 || 78–75
|- bgcolor="ffbbbb"
| 156 || September 29 || @ Reds || 3–11 || Walters || Rambert (0–1) || Vander Meer || 13,860 || 78–76
|-

|-
| Legend:       = Win       = Loss       = TieBold = Pirates team member

Opening Day lineup

Roster

Player stats

Batting

Starters by position 
Note: Pos = Position; G = Games played; AB = At bats; H = Hits; Avg. = Batting average; HR = Home runs; RBI = Runs batted in

Other batters 
Note: G = Games played; AB = At bats; H = Hits; Avg. = Batting average; HR = Home runs; RBI = Runs batted in

Pitching

Starting pitchers 
Note: G = Games pitched; IP = Innings pitched; W = Wins; L = Losses; ERA = Earned run average; SO = Strikeouts

Other pitchers 
Note: G = Games pitched; IP = Innings pitched; W = Wins; L = Losses; ERA = Earned run average; SO = Strikeouts

Relief pitchers 
Note: G = Games pitched; W = Wins; L = Losses; SV = Saves; ERA = Earned run average; SO = Strikeouts

Farm system

Notes

References 
 1940 Pittsburgh Pirates team page at Baseball Reference
 1940 Pittsburgh Pirates Page at Baseball Almanac

Pittsburgh Pirates seasons
Pittsburgh Pirates season
Pittsburg Pir